Boris Grigoryevich Fyodorov (13 February 1958 in Moscow – 20 November 2008 in London) was a Russian economist, politician, and reformer.

Early life
He was awarded a doctor of economics degree from the Moscow Finance Institute and authored over 200 publications.

Career
In 1988 working very closely with Fyodorov, Alexander Zhukov, and Kirill Ugolnikov,  Deloitte & Touche began providing services to the Soviet Union and continued with Russia.

Fyodorov was Minister of Finance of the Russian SFSR (as a constituent of the USSR) in 1990. From 1991 to 1992 he worked for the European Bank for Reconstruction and Development in London. In 1992 he became director of the World Bank. He served as Finance Minister of Russia from 1993 until 1994, when he resigned. While he was at the Ministry of Finance (MinFin), he brought to MinFin Segei Aleksashenko, Andrey Kazmin, Igor Selivanov, and Mikhail Kasyanov. Fyodorov was a member of the State Duma between 1994 and 1998. From 14 August 1998 until 28 September 1998, he became a tax minister and Deputy Prime Minister of Russia during the Russian financial crisis which began on 17 August 1998.

United Financial Group
In 1994, he and Charles Ryan, a United States banker and Libertarian, founded United Financial Group (UFG), an investment bank with Charles Ryan as its chairman, which, in 2005, was sold to Deutsche Bank. United Financial Group was established with a Moscow-based parent firm and an Isle of Man based United Financial Group firm managing its shell companies around the world. The address of the Isle of Man-based UFG firm is the same address as the Isle of Man office of Deloitte & Touche.

Fyodorov was a member of various boards including Gazprom, Sberbank and Ingosstrakh.

In February 2002, while Fyodorov was an independent director of Gazprom, he stated that PricewaterhouseCoopers (PwC) signed off on poorly performed audits of natural gas firm interactions such as Gazprom-Itera because PwC wanted to keep the account with Gazprom saying "If an auditor knows it cannot do a proper review, then it is just doing it for the money." Further, he said that any audits by Deloitte & Touche into the Gazprom-Itera interactions were strongly opposed by Gazprom management.

He was also a general partner of UFG Private Equity starting from 2006.

Fyodorov died from a stroke on 20 November 2008 in London, England, at the age of 50.

Notes

References

1958 births
2008 deaths
Economists from Moscow
Communist Party of the Soviet Union members
People's Freedom Party politicians
Deputy heads of government of the Russian Federation
Finance ministers of Russia
First convocation members of the State Duma (Russian Federation)
Second convocation members of the State Duma (Russian Federation)
Gazprom people
Burials in Troyekurovskoye Cemetery
Financial University under the Government of the Russian Federation alumni